Božena Komárková (28 January 1903, Tišnov – 27 January 1997, Brno) was Czech philosopher and theologian.

Most of her work remained unknown both in the Czech Republic and abroad till the Velvet Revolution, since Nazi and communist regimes persecuted her and tried to isolate her from society.

In 2003 a selection of Komárková's essays was published in English under the title Human Rights and the Rise of the Secular Age.

External links
 Czechs and Germans in Our Century (article by Komárková from 1966)

Czech Protestants
1903 births
1997 deaths
People from Tišnov
Recipients of the Order of Tomáš Garrigue Masaryk
Czech women philosophers
Czech theologians
20th-century Czech philosophers